Shilu Town is the county seat of Changjiang Li Autonomous County in China's Hainan Island. It is known for a major iron ore deposit (the Shilu Iron Ore Mine, 石碌铁矿), which has been worked since the Japanese occupation of the island in the early 1940s.

Notes

Township-level divisions of Hainan
Changjiang Li Autonomous County
County seats in Hainan